The Dell Inspiron series is a line of laptop computers made by American company Dell. The first Inspiron laptop model was introduced before 1999. Unlike the Dell Latitude line, which is aimed mostly at business/enterprise markets, Inspiron is a consumer-oriented line, often marketed towards individual customers as computers for everyday use.

Early models 

This list is incomplete; the early Dell Inspiron models listed below went through a number of changes from 1999 to 2006, so the specifications on each model may be incomplete or incorrect. There are also some earlier models than these, but those have not been added to the list yet.

Inspiron 7500 
Released in 1999, the Dell Inspiron 7500 was a speedy laptop that Dell branded as "A Mobile Desktop". Its starting price was $4,101.

Processor: Intel Pentium III @750, 700, 650, 600, 500 or 450 MHz, Intel Celeron @433, 450, 466, or 500 MHz
Memory: 32, 64, 128, 192, 256 or 512 MB of PC100 RAM
Graphics: ATI Rage Mobility M (with 4 or 8MB of video memory)
Display: 15" 1024x768, optional 1400x1050, 15.4" 1280x1024
Storage: 4.8, 6, 10, 20 or 30 GB Ultra ATA hard drive

Inspiron 2100 

Released in 1998, the Dell Inspiron 2100 was a lightweight laptop that Dell branded as "Ultra-Thin & Light" and "Ultra Mobile". Its starting price was $1,699.

 Processor: Intel Pentium III @700 MHz
 Memory: 128 or 256 MB of DDR RAM
 Graphics: ATI Rage Mobility M (with 4MB of video memory)
 Display: 12.1" 1024x768
 Storage: 10 or 20 GB Ultra ATA hard drive

Inspiron 3500

Inspiron 3800 

Released in 2000, the Dell Inspiron 3800 was an affordable laptop that Dell branded as "Stylish and Affordable". Its starting price was $1,199.

 Processor: Intel Pentium III @700 or 600 MHz, Intel Celeron @600 or 700 MHz
 Memory: 32, 64, 96, 128, 192, 256, 384 or 512 MB of DDR RAM
 Graphics: ATI Rage Mobility (with 8 MB of video memory, 2x AGP)
 Display: 12.1" 800x600, or a 14.1" 1024x768
 Storage: 5, 6, 10, or 20 GB Ultra ATA hard drive

Inspiron 4000 

Released in 2000, the Dell Inspiron 4000 was a lightweight laptop that Dell branded as "Ultra-Thin & Light" and "Light as a feather, strong as an ox". Its starting price was $1,499.

 Processor: Intel Pentium III @650, 700, 800 or 850 MHz, or an Intel Celeron @600 MHz
 Memory: 64, 128, 192, 256, 384 or 512 MB of DDR RAM
 Graphics: ATI RAGE Mobility 128 3D (with 8 MB of video RAM, 2x AGP)
 Display: 14.1" 1024x768, optional 1400x1050
 Storage: 5, 10, or 20 GB Ultra ATA hard drive

Inspiron 8000 

Released in 2000, the Dell Inspiron 8000 was a mobile workstation that Dell branded as a mobile desktop. Its starting price was $1,649.
 Processor: Intel Pentium III @650, 700, 800, 833, 850, 900, 1000, 1113, or 1200 MHz.
 Memory: 64, 128, 192, 256, 384 or 512 MB of DDR RAM
 Graphics: ATI Mobility — M4 (with 8, 16 or 32 MB of video memory) or RADEON 7500 (with 64 MB of video memory), or NVIDIA GeForce2 Go (with 16 or 32 MB of video memory)
 Display: 14.1” 1400x1050, a 15” 1400x1050, optional 1600x1200.
 Storage: 5, 10, 20, 30, 32, 40, or 60 GB Ultra ATA hard drive

Inspiron 2600/2650 

Released: 2002

The Inspiron 2600 and 2650 were clones of the Latitude V710 and V740, respectively.

 Processor: Celeron M @1.3 GHz or Pentium 4 M @ 1.6, 1.7, or 1.9 GHz
 Memory: 128, 192, 256, 384, or 512 MB @ 266 MHz (up to 512 MB)
 Graphics: Intel 3D AGP (32 MB Shared Memory), nVidia GeForce2 Go 100 16 MB or 32 MB
 Storage: 20, 30, or 40 GB HDD
 Display: 14.1 inch display, 15 inch display, or 15 inch SXGA+ display.

Inspiron 8500/8600 

Released: 2003

The Inspiron 8500 and 8600 were mainstream notebooks that were clones of the Latitude D800 and D810. The Inspiron 8500 utilized am Intel Pentium 4 M processor, while the Inspiron 8600 was based on Intel's Centrino Platform and utilized an Intel Pentium M/Centrino Processor. Since they were clones of the D800/D810, they included many Latitude-specific features such as the Dell D-Dock and the D-bay (which allowed users to swap out the CD drive for a floppy drive or secondary battery). Like the Inspiron 1100/5100 series that was also released in 2003, the 8500 and 8600 were among the first Dell laptops to be offered in Venice Blue and Moonlight Silver. Additionally, snap-on faux-wood lid covers were an available accessory which allowed customers to customize the look of their Inspiron.

 Processor: Intel Pentium 4 Mobile @ 2 GHz or 2.4 GHz (8500), Intel Pentium M/Centrino @ 1.3 GHz, 1.4 GHz, or 1.7 GHz (8600).
 Memory: 128 MB @ 333 MHz (up to 2 GB)
 Graphics: Inspiron 8500: ATi Mobility Radeon 9000 32 MB, nVidia GeForce 4 4200 Go 64 MB.
Inspiron 8600: nVidia GeForce 4 4200 Go 64 MB, ATi Mobility Radeon 9600 128 MB, nVidia GeForce FX Go5650 128 MB.
 Storage: 30, 40, 60, or 80 GB HDD.
 Display: 15.4 inch display in 1680x1050 or 1920x1200 w/WUXGA.

Inspiron 1300/B130/B120 

Released in late 2005, the Inspiron 1300/B130/B120 is the successor to the Inspiron 2200. The Inspiron B120 is 14-inch, B130 is 15-inch. The Inspiron 1300 is available in both screen sizes. It cost $599 for the base model.

 Processor: Intel Celeron or Pentium M
 Memory: 256 MB, 512 MB, 1 GB of DDR2 PC2-4200 RAM, upgradable to 2 GB.
 Graphics: Intel GMA 900 with 128 MB of shared graphics memory.
 Display: 14" or 15.4" WXGA display 
 Storage: 40 or 60 GB Ultra ATA hard drive
 Battery: 29 Wh Lihium-ion, 4-cell (Optional 6-cell available)

Inspiron 2200 
Released in 2005, the Inspiron 2200 is the successor to the Inspiron 1000. It was branded as "Notebook Essentials" and started at $799.

 Processor: Intel Celeron or Pentium M
 Memory: 256 MB or 512 MB of DDR RAM, upgradable to 2 GB
 Graphics: Intel Extreme 2 Graphics 
 Display: 14" or 15" XGA display
 Storage: 30, 40, or 60 GB Ultra ATA hard drive
 Battery: 65 Wh Lithium-ion, 8-cell

Inspiron 1100 and 5100 Series 

Released in 2003, Inspiron 1100 and 5100 series consisted of five models: the Inspiron 1100, 1150, 5100, 5150, and 5160. Additionally, there was a rebadged version of these models sold as the Latitude 100L. The Inspiron 1100 and 1150 were the budget line of this series, the 5100 and 5160 was the mainstream line, and the 5150 was aimed towards higher end users. This model line were among the first Dell laptops to be offered in Dell’s new color scheme: Venice Blue and Moonlight Silver (1100, 5100, 5150), or Moonlight Silver (1150, 5160, 100L).

This model line was infamous for several well documented problems, which resulted in numerous class action lawsuits against Dell. These issues included: overheating, faulty motherboards, and power supply failures.

Inspiron 1100:
Released: 2003
 Processor: 2 GHz Intel Celeron M or 2.4 GHz Intel Pentium 4 M 
 Memory: 256 MB @ 266 MHz (up to 1 GB)
 Graphics: Intel 82845G Graphics Controller 64MB
 Storage: 30 GB or 40 GB HDD
 Display: 14.1 inch or 15 inch XGA display.

Inspiron 1150: 
Released: 2003
 Processor: 2.2 GHz Intel Celeron M, 2.4 GHz Intel Pentium 4 M, 2.8 GHz Pentium 4 M 
 Memory: 256 MB @ 266 MHz (up to 1 GB)
 Graphics: Intel 852MV Graphics Controller 64 MB
 Storage: 30 GB, 40 GB, or 60 GB HDD
 Display: 14.1 inch or 15 inch XGA display.

Inspiron 5100: 
Released: 2003
 Processor: 2.4 GHz or 2.8 GHz Intel Pentium 4 Northwood
 Memory: 128 MB @ 266 MHz (up to 1 GB)
 Graphics: ATI Mobility Radeon 7500 Dedicated Graphics, 16 or 32 MB
 Storage: 30 GB or 40 GB HDD
 Display: 14.1 inch XGA display, 15 inch 1024x768 XGA display, 15 inch 1400x1500 XGA display.

Inspiron 5150: 
Released: 2003
 Processor: 3.06 GHz Intel Pentium 4 M
 Memory: 256 MB @ 333 MHz (up to 2 GB)
 Graphics: ATI Mobility Radeon 9000 Dedicated Graphics, 32 or 64 MB. 
 Storage: 40 GB or 60 GB HDD
 Display: 15 inch XGA display or 15 inch UXGA (1600x1200 resolution) display.

Inspiron 5160: 
Released: 2004
 Processor: 2.8 GHz or 3.2 GHz Intel Pentium 4 M
 Memory: 512 MB @ 333 MHz (up to 2 GB)
 Graphics: Nvidia GeForce Go5200 Dedicated Graphics, 32 or 64 MB. 
 Storage: 60 GB or 100 GB HDD
 Display: 15-inch 1024x768 XGA display or 15-inch 1400x1500 XGA display.

Inspiron Mini Series (2008-2010)
The Dell Inspiron Mini Series is a sub-line of subnotebook/netbook computers designed by Dell. The series was introduced in September 2008 amidst the growing popularity of low-cost netbook computers introduced by competitors. This sub-line has since been discontinued.

Inspiron 3000 Series

Inspiron 11 3000 2-in-1(31##) 

3147: —  Released in 2014, The Inspiron 11 3000 Series 2-in-1 is a 2-in-1 notebook with an 11-inch touchscreen and Intel processors. It competes with Acer Aspire R 11, Asus Transformer Book Flip TP200, HP Pavilion x360, HP Stream x360, Lenovo Yoga 2 11 and Toshiba Satellite Radius 11.
 Processor: Intel Celeron or Pentium
 Memory: 4 GB
 Graphics: Intel HD Graphics
 Display: 11.6" LED Backlit Display, 1366x768 pixels
 Storage: SATA 500 GB (5400 RPM)
 Battery: 3-cell Lithium-Ion Battery
 Camera: HD 720p Web Camera
 Wireless: Wi-Fi: Intel Centrino Wireless-AC 3160; Bluetooth 4.0
 I/O ports: 2 USB 3.0, 1 USB 2.0, 1 HDMI port, 4-in-1 SD Card Reader, 1 Ethernet port, 1 combined headphone/microphone jack, 1 security lock, 1 power adapter port.

3148: —  — this model features a HDMI port, 1x USB 3.0 and 2x USB 2.0 Type-A ports, a headphone/microphone combo (headset) port, a media-card reader and a security-cable slot. Its processors are from the 4th generation of Intel Core i3 processors with one SO-DIMM slot supporting DDR3L memory. It uses Intel HD graphics and the Realtek ALC3234 audio controller and a 2.5-inch HDD with SATA 3 Gbit/s capabilities. The integrated webcam above the display has a camera resolution is 0.92 megapixel and its maximum video recording resolution is 1280x720 (HD) at 30 FPS. The battery of the laptop is a 3 cell battery with a voltage of 11.4 VDC. The power adapter bundled with the laptop is capable of 65w and outputs a 3.34 A.

3158: —  —

3168: — this model features a HDMI port, 1x USB 3.0 and 2x USB 2.0 Type-A ports, a headphone/microphone combo port, a microSD card reader, and  a security cable slot. It comes with a Intel Celeron N3060, Intel Pentium N3170 or Intel Core-m3 CPU, each supporting up to 4 GB of RAM. There are 2 models, one that comes with the Intel Celeron CPU, 2 or 4 GB of RAM and a 32 GB eMMC drive. As the RAM and eMMC are soldered in, you cannot upgrade this model. The other version comes with either the Pentium or Core-m3 CPU, 2 or 4 GB of RAM socketed, and a 500 GB 2.5 inch HDD, upgradable to any SATA based 2.5 inch drive. Both models are touchscreen and comes in Bali Blue, Tango Red, white and later, Fog Grey. Matching wireless mice and laptop sleeves in those colors were offered as accessories.

Inspiron 11 3000 (31##)

3162: — this model features a HDMI port, 1x USB 3.0 and 1x USB 2.0 Type-A ports, a headphone/microphone combo (headset) port and a media-card reader. The laptop uses either dual-core Intel Celeron or quad-core Intel Pentium processors. The audio controller inside the laptop is a Realtek ALC3234 and the multi-car reader supports one SD card in the form factor of micro SD card of the type being SD, SDHC or SDXC. The integrated webcam above the display has a camera resolution is 0.92 megapixel and its maximum video recording resolution is 1280x720 (HD) at 30 FPS. The battery of the laptop is a 2-cell prismatic battery with a voltage of 7.6 VDC. The power adapter bundled with the laptop is capable of 45w and outputs a 2.31 A. The Dell Inspiron 3162 is available in three colours: red, white, and blue.

3180

Inspiron 14 3000 (34##)
14" laptops under the Inspiron 3000 branding and equipped with Intel processors.

 3452: - Intel (Celeron dual core or Pentium quad core) processor, Intel integrated graphics and 14-inch HD (1366 x 768) non-touch display.
 3467: - Intel (6th generation Core i3 or 7th generation Core i3/i5/i7) processor, Intel HD Graphics (520 or 620) or AMD Radeon R5 M430 and 14-inch HD (1366 x 768) non-touch display.
 3473: - Intel (Pentium Silver N5000 or Celeron N4000) processor, Intel UHD Graphics (600 or 605) and 14-inch HD (1366 x 768) non-touch display.
 3476: - Intel (8th generation Core i5/i7) processor, Intel UHD Graphics 620 and or AMD Radeon 520 and 14-inch HD (1366 x 768) non-touch display.

Inspiron 15 3000 (35##)

Intel

15" laptops under the Inspiron 3000 branding and equipped with Intel processors.

 3552: — Intel Celeron processor N3060, 4 GB memory, 500 GB hard drive, integrated Intel HD graphics, DVD+/-RW drive, Wireless-AC/Bluetooth, 4-cell battery, media card reader, HDMI and USB 3.0 ports, 15.6" HD LED-backlit display
 3558 —  — 
 3573
 3576
3583 - Inspiron 3583 has Intel's 8th Gen Core i3-8145U and Intel's UHD 620 Graphics.
 3584: — Fully customizable, with up to an intel Core i7, 16 GB memory, 2 TB HDD, 256 GB SSD, and AMD Radeon 535 graphics. Comes as standard with three USB 3.1 ports, one USB 2.0 port, a combination headphone/microphone 3.5 mm port, a HDMI 1.4 port, an SD card reader, a Noble wedge lock slot and a 10/100 Mbps RJ45 ethernet port.

AMD 
15" laptops under the Inspiron 3000 branding and equipped with AMD processors.

 3555 — 
 3541 — 
and the 3151

Inspiron 5000 Series

Inspiron 13 5000 2-in-1 (53##) 
5368: —
 Processor: 6th gen Intel Core i5-6300u (2.4 GHz) or i7-6600U (2.6 GHz)
 Memory: 8 GB (Expandable up to 16 GB)
 Display: 13" LED-backlit, 1920 x 1080, 10 point multi-touch touchscreen
 Graphics: Intel HD 520

5378: —
 Processor: 7th gen Intel Core i3-7100U (2.4 GHz), i5-7200U (3.10 GHz) or i7-7500U (4M Cache, up to 3.50 GHz) Dual-core
 Memory: 4 GB or 8 GB (Expandable up to 16 GB)
 Graphics: Intel HD 620
 Storage: SATA 2.5" (500 GB, 1 TB HDD)
 Display: 13" LED-backlit, 1920 x 1080, Limited HDR support; 10 point multi-touch touchscreen

5379: —
 Processor: 8th gen Intel Core i5-8250U (3.40 GHz) or i7-8550U (8M Cache, up to 4.00 GHz)
 Memory: 8 GB (Expandable up to 32 GB)
 Display: 13" LED-backlit, 1920 x 1080, 10 point multi-touch touchscreen
 Graphics: Intel HD 620

Inspiron 14 5000 (54##) 
5420: — 3rd Generation Intel Core i3, i5 or i7; or AMD A4-4300M, A6-4400M, A8-4500M, A10-4600M.

5457: —  Intel Pentium or 6th gen Core i3/i5/i7.

5480: — 8th gen Whisky Lake Intel Core i3/i5/i7.

5490: — 2019's model with 10th gen i3, i5 and i7 with up to 16gb ram and 1tb ssd and graphics card up to Gtx 1650ti (4 GB)

5402:  — 2020's model, Intel 11th gen up to i7-1165G7 processor; Up to 12 GB (one slot + 4 GB) DDR4, 3200 MHz. aluminium cover and palmrest, fingerprint reader option. 1920 x 1080 IPS screen.

Inspiron 15R N5000 
N5110 - Predecessor model N5010.  The N5110 released in 2011 with Intel Sandy Bridge platform, options for processors i3, i5 and i7.

Processor: Intel Core i3-2310M, i5-2450M or i7-2670QM.
 RAM Memory: 1333 MHz DDR3 (2 slots), 2 GB up to 8 GB
 Graphics: Intel HD 3000 onboard or Nvidia GeForce GT 525M discrete card
 Display: 15.6" LED Backlit Display, 1366x768 pixels
 Storage: SATA, HDD (5400 RPM)
 Optical Drive: Yes
 Battery: 6-cell 4140 mAh Li-Ion
 Camera: HD 720p Web Camera
 Audio Controller: IDT 92HD87, speakers 2 x 2 Watt
 Wi-Fi and Bluetooth: Intel Centrino Wireless-N 1030 + Bluetooth 4.0
 I/O ports: 2 USB 3.0, 1 USB 2.0, 1 eSATA, 1 HDMI port, 1 VGA (D-Sub) port, 4-in-1 SD Card Reader, 1 Ethernet port, 1  headphone, 1 microphone jack, 1 security lock, 1 power adapter port.
 Dimensions and weight: 2.6 kg with battery, 376 mm width, 260.2 mm depth, 35.3 mm rear to 30.7 mm front height

Inspiron 15 5000 2-in-1 (55##) 
5568

Inspiron 15 5000 (55##) 
5502— 

5520: — 3rd Generation Intel Core i3, i5 or i7; or AMD A4-4300M, A6-4400M, A8-4500M, A10-4600M.

5521: — 3rd Generation Intel Core i3, i5 or i7.

5537: — 4th Generation Intel Core i3, i5 or i7 with AMD Radeon Graphics.

5545: — AMD A8-7100 APU or AMD-7300 APU.

5547: —  Laptop available in i5 (Non-Touch/Touch Screen), i7 (Non-Touch/Touch Screen), AMD 18 (Non-Touch) versions.
 
 Processor: Intel Core i5-4210U or i7-4510U, AMD A8.
 Memory: 8 or 12 GB, up to 16 GB DDR3L (2 slots)
 Graphics: Intel HD 4400
 Display: 15.6" LED Backlit Display, 1366x768 pixels
 Storage: SATA, HDD 1 TB (5400 RPM)
 Optical Drive: Yes
 Battery: 3-cell Li-Ion
 Camera: HD 720p Web Camera
 Wi-Fi and Bluetooth: Intel Centrino Wireless-AC 3160 + Bluetooth 4.0
 I/O ports: 2 USB 3.0, 1 USB 2.0, 1 HDMI port, 4-in-1 SD Card Reader, 1 Ethernet port, 1 combined headphone/microphone jack, 1 security lock, 1 power adapter port.

5548: — Intel Core 5th generation i5/i7 processors.

5551: — Intel (Celeron or Pentium) processors.

5552: — Intel (Celeron or Pentium) processors. 1 DDR3L RAM slot (up to 8 GB).

5555: — 
 Processor: AMD APU: E1-7010, E2-7110, A4-7210 @1.8 GHz, A6-7310 @2 GHz, A8-7410 @2.2 GHz, or A10-8700P @1.8 GHz
 Memory: 4, 8, 12, or 16 GB DDR3L 1600 MHz (2 slots)
 Graphics: AMD Radeon R2, R3, R4, R5, or R6 Integrated
 Display: 15.6" Dell TrueLife Non-touch or touch 1366x768
 Storage: Seagate Thin HDD SATA 500 GB, 1 TB, or 2 TB (5400 RPM) or 128/256 GB SSD
 Optical Drive: TSSCorp DVD-RW
 Battery: 4-cell 40 WHr or 47 WHr Li-Ion
 Camera: HD 720p, with stereo microphones
 Wi-Fi and Bluetooth: Dell Wireless 1707 Card (802.1b/g/n + Bluetooth 4.0, 2.4 GHz)
 I/O ports: 1 USB 3.0, 2 USB 2.0, 1 HDMI 1.4a port, SD Card Reader, 1 Ethernet port, 1 combined headphone/microphone jack, 1 security lock, 1 power adapter port.
 Keyboard: Full-size non-backlit or backlit spill-resistant keyboard w/ number pad

5557: — 6th generation Intel Core i3/i5/i7 processors.

5558: —
 Processor: Intel Broadwell microarchitecture
 Memory: 4, 8, or up to 16GB DDR3L-1600 (2 slots)

5559: — 
 Processor: Intel Core 6th generation i3/15/i7 or Celeron/Pentium processors
 Memory: 4, 6, 8, or up to 16 GB DDR3L-1600 (2 slots)
 Graphics: Intel Integrated Graphics 510 / 520 (integrated) or AMD Radeon R5 M335 (discrete)
 Display: 15.6" LED-backlit, 1366x768 or 1920x1080 pixels
 Pen/Touch: can be equipped with or without 10-point touch screen
 Keyboard: Full size keyboard (can be equipped with backlight)

5566: — 
Features Intel Kaby Lake Microprocessors.
 Processor: Intel Core i7-7500U, or i5-7200U.
 Memory: 8 GB, DDR4 (2 slots)
 Graphics: Intel HD 610 or 620
 Display: 15.6" LED-backlit, 1366x768 pixels
 Storage: SATA: 256/512 GB (SSD), 1 TB (5400 RPM HDD)
 Optical Drive: Yes
 Battery: 6-cell Li-Ion
 Camera: HD 720p Web Camera
 Wi-Fi and Bluetooth: Intel Centrino Wireless-AC 3160 + Bluetooth 4.0
 I/O ports: 2 USB 3.0, 1 USB 2.0, 1 HDMI port, 4-in-1 SD Card Reader, 1 Ethernet port, 1 combined headphone/microphone jack, 1 security lock, 1 power adapter port.

5567: —  
Features Intel Kaby Lake Microprocessors

5570: — Released in 2017, and has a starting price of €599. Intel Celeron or Pentium, or 6th gen Core i3, or 7th gen Core i3/i5/i7, or 8th gen Core i3/i5/i7 processors.

5593: — Released in 2020, Up to 10th Generation Intel Core i5-1035G1, integrated graphics, m.2 NVME SSD.

Inspiron 17 5000 (57##) 

5720: --  Intel Core i3

5755: — AMD A8-7410 or AMD A10-8700P processors.

5758: — Intel (Pentium or 4th gen Core i3 or 5th gen Core i3/i5/i7) processors.

5759: — Intel 6th gen i3/i5/i7 processors.

5767: — up to Intel Core i7-7500U, 8 GB RAM and a Radeon R7 M445 (2 GB)

5770: — Intel (Celeron or Pentium or 6th gen Core i3 or 7th gen Core i3/i5/i7 or 8th gen i3/i5/i7) processors.

5775: — 2nd generation AMD Ryzen U-series processors.

Inspiron 7000 Series

Inspiron 13 7000 

 7380: — 8th Gen Intel CPU; 16GB DDR4 memory.

Inspiron 13 7000 2-in-1 

Inspiron 13 7000 2-in-1 is a 2-in-1 notebook line with a 13-inch touchscreen, Intel processors and aluminum case. It competes with Acer Aspire R 14, Asus Transformer Book Flip, HP Pavilion 13 x360, Lenovo Yoga 3, Samsung Notebook 7 spin (13-inch), Toshiba Satellite Radius 12 and 14.

 7348: — Late 2014 — 5th gen Intel Core i3/i5/i7 - 1600 MHz DDR3L memory 4 or 8 GB (1 slot)
 7352: — Late 2014 - 5th gen Intel Core i5/i7 - 1600 MHz DDR3L memory 4 or 8 GB (1 slot)
 7353: — Early 2015 - 6th gen Intel Core i5/i7 - 1600 MHz DDR3L memory 4 or 8 GB (1 slot)
 7359: — Late 2015 - 6th gen Intel Core i3/i5/i7 or Pentium Dual Core processor - 1600 MHz DDR3L memory 4 or 8GB (1 slot)
 7368: — Late 2016 - 6th gen Intel Core i3/i5/i7 or Celeron/Pentium Dual Core processor - 2133 MHz DDR4 memory (4/8/12/16 GB - 2 slots)
 7375: — Late 2017 - AMD Ryzen 3 / 5 / 7 processor - 2400 MHz DDR4 memory (4/8/12/16 GB - 2 slots) - HD or FHD Display
 7378: — Late 2016 / 2017 - 7th gen Intel Core i3/i5/i7 or Celeron/Pentium Dual Core processor - 2133 MHz DDR4 memory (4/8/12/16 GB - 2 slots) - HD or FHD Display
 7373: — Late 2017 - 8th gen Intel Core i5/i7 processor - 2133 MHz or 2400 MHz DDR4 memory 8 or 16 GB (Soldered to motherboard) -  FHD Display
 7386: — Late 2018 / 2019 - 8th gen Intel Core i5/i7 processor - 2400 MHz DDR4 memory 8 or 16 GB  (Soldered to motherboard) -  FHD or UHD Display
 7391: — Late 2019 / 2020 - 10th gen Intel Core i5/i7 processor - 2133 MHz LPDDR3 memory 8 or 16 GB (Soldered to motherboard) - FHD or UHD Display

Inspiron 14 7000 
7420: — 12th Generation Intel Core i3, i5 or i7; or AMD A4-4300M, A6-4400M, A8-4500M, A10-4600M.

Inspiron 14 2-in-1 
7420/7425 - Intel variant (7420) with 12th Gen i5-1235U/i7-1255U with Iris Xe Graphics, and AMD Variant (7425) with Ryzen 5 5625U/Ryzen 7 5825U with Radeon Graphics. 8 or 16 GB DDR4 3200 MHz RAM. FHD+ Display. Marketed as "New Inspiron 14 2-in-1" or simply "Inspiron 14 2-in-1".

Inspiron 15 7000 

7520 SE: — 
 Processor: Intel Core i7-3612QM or Intel Core i7-3632QM.
 Memory: Between 4 and 8 GB of DDR3 SODIMM (2 slots). 16 GB of memory is unofficially supported.
 Graphics: AMD Radeon HD 7730M dedicated GPU with 2GB integrated memory, and Intel HD 4000 integrated GPU.  
 Display: 15.6" LED Backlit Display, 1920x1080 pixels
 Storage: 500 GB HDD or 1 TB HDD (SATA, 5400 rpm). Optional mSATA interface supporting up to 32 GB of additional SSD storage.
 Optical Drive: DVD-RW or Blu-Ray.
 Battery: 6-cell Li-Ion
 Camera: HD 720p Web Camera
 Audio: Conexant "SmartAudio HD" CX20672-21Z audio codec, two 2-watt Skullcandy speakers, microphone in camera assembly, headphone and microphone jacks.
 Wi-Fi and Bluetooth: Intel Centrino Wireless-N 2230.
 I/O ports: 4 USB 3.0 ports, 1 HDMI port, 1 VGA port, 1 8-in-1 SD Card Reader, 1 Ethernet port, 1 power adapter port.

7559: — 6th generation Intel Core i5/i7 processors.

7566: — 6th generation Intel Core i5/i7 processors.

7567: — 7th generation Intel Core i5/i7 processors.

7577: — 7th generation Intel Core i5/i7 processors (with USB Type-C).

7570: — 8th generation Intel Core i5/i7 processors (with USB Type-C).

7580: — 8th generation Intel Core i5/i7 processors (with USB Type-C).

7590: — 9th generation Intel Core i5/i7 processors (with USB Type-C).

7501: — 10th generation Intel Core i5/i7 processors (with USB Type-C).

7510: — 11th generation Intel Core i5/i7 processors (with USB Type-C).

Inspiron 15 7000 2-in-1 
Released in 2015, The Inspiron 15 7000 Series 2-in-1 is a 2-in-1 notebook with a 15-inch touchscreen and Intel processors. It competes with Acer Aspire R 15, Asus Transformer Book Flip TP500, TP550, HP Envy x360, Lenovo Flex 2 15, 3 15, Samsung Notebook 7 spin (15-inch) and Toshiba Satellite Fusion.

 7558: — 5th generation Intel Core i5/i7 processors.
 7569: — 6th generation Intel Core i5/i7 processors.
 7579: — 7th generation Intel Core i5/i7 processors (with USB Type-C).
 7573: — 8th generation Intel Core i5/i7 processors (with USB Type-C).
 7586: — 8th generation Intel Core i5/i7 processors (with USB Type-C) 
 7591: — 10th generation Intel Core i5/i7 processors (with USB Type-C).

Inspiron 17 7000 

 7737: — 4th generation Intel Core i3/i5/i7 processors.
 7746: — 5th generation Intel Core i5/i7 processors.

Inspiron 17 7000 2-in-1 
The Inspiron 17 7000 series 2-in-1 is an convertible line with aluminum case. It uses a 17-inch display, and is the largest Inspiron 2-in-1 laptop.

 7778: — 
 7786: — 8th gen Intel Core i5/i7 processor.
 7790: — Up to 16 GB DDR4, Nvidia 250MX video.

Inspiron Gaming Series (Pandora) (2015-2018)

Inspiron 14 Gaming/Inspiron 14 7000 (7447) 
The 2015 Dell Inspiron 7447 (Inspiron 14) is a gaming oriented laptop with a discrete 4 GB Nvidia GeForce GTX 850M. It has either an Intel i5-4210H or the Intel i7-4710HQ with up to 8 GB of DDR3L RAM and expandable up to 16 GB.

Inspiron 15 Gaming/Inspiron 15 7000 (7559) 
The Dell Inspiron 7559 (Inspiron 15) is a gaming-oriented laptop with discrete Nvidia GeForce GTX 960M and comes in black with red trim plastic case. The RAM is standard at 8 GB of DDR3L RAM and expandable up to 16 GB. It competes with the HP Pavilion Gaming Series and HP Omen.

Inspiron 15 7000 Gaming (75##) 
7566 — The Inspiron 15 changes the styling from the Inspiron 15 7000 (7559) while retaining the Nvidia GeForce GTX 960M dedicated graphics card.

7567 — These model has the same design as the Inspiron 15 Gaming (7566) with the main difference being the replacement of the Nvidia GeForce GTX 960M with either an GeForce GTX 1050 or GeForce GTX 1050Ti. The laptop uses DDR4 RAM which can be upgraded to 32 GB and has one M.2 slot for an SSD and one M.2 slot for a wireless card. The screen was improved by switching from a TN to IPS LCD.

7577 — The 2018's model changes the styling of the fan and speaker grills from the Inspiron 15 7000 Gaming (7567). The Nvidia GeForce GTX 1050 graphics card was replaced with a GeForce GTX 1060 Max-Q for improved performance.

Inspiron 15 5000 Gaming (AMD) (5576) 
The Dell Inspiron 15 5000 Gaming (AMD) (5576) is a lower-priced gaming-oriented laptop using either 7th generation AMD (FX 9830P or  A10 9630P) Quad Core processors. The integrated video controller is an AMD Radeon R5 or R7 with shared system memory and its discrete video controller is an AMD Radeon RX460 with 4 GB GDDR5 memory. Like the Inspiron 15 7000 Gaming series, the laptop uses DDR4 RAM which can be upgraded to 32 GB and has one M.2 slot for an SSD and one M.2 slot for a wireless card. The I/O includes one Ethernet port, one USB 3.0 port with PowerShare, two USB 3.0 data ports, one HDMI port, and one headset port. The audio controller used is a Realtek ALC3246 with Waves MaxxAudio Pro with two speakers and one subwoofer. The card reader is a 2-in-1 type supporting SD card and MultiMedia card (MMC). The webcam is capable of 1 megapixel still images and 720p HD video at 30 fps. The display used is a 15.6-inch FHD non-touch screen with a refresh rate of 60 Hz.

The Inspiron Gaming Series (Pandora) was replaced by Dell G Series in 2018.

Rebadging 
In the past, Dell has modified some existing Inspiron machines to produce computers of higher or lower quality.

The first-generation Inspiron XPS and Inspiron 9100 (2004–2006) shared the same options in processors (Intel Pentium 4 HT "Prescott"), RAM (DDR 400 MHz), hard-drives (Ultra-ATA 5400/7200 rpm), wireless cards, LCD screens (at 15.4-inches; WXGA, WSXGA+, WUXGA) and graphics cards (ATI Mobility Radeon 9700 64 MB/128 MB), as well as the same chassis. Dell marketed the XPS as an "ultimate gaming machine", while marketed the 9100 as a "desktop replacement". The Inspiron 9100 is a rebadged XPS with the only difference between the two computers is the LCD Panel. Although both support a 15.4 Samsung LCD, only later models of the 9100 (3.2 GHz) use the identical LCD screen (Dell Part #s 7T774/W3866). The Samsung LCD Panel supports 1920×1200. Previous 2.8-3.0 GHz Inspiron 9100 use a lesser panel with resolutions of 1280×800 (Dell Part # Y0316).

In recent years, several Dell Vostro laptops share the same chassis with Inspiron laptops. For example, the Inspiron 14 5000 (5480) and Vostro 14 5000 (5481) uses the same chassis.

Problems

Overheating 
In 2003, Dell released several lines of Inspiron notebooks that had overheating issues. The systems would overheat and could cause damage to the microprocessor, video card, and motherboard. These systems would also randomly shut down due to overly-high internal temperatures. Overheating in these Inspiron systems is mainly caused by performance-consuming tasks and software. This problem was determined to be due to the design of the air-flow from the bottom of the system. It would draw in dirt/dust and clog the heat sink, making air unable to pass through in order to cool the system. Affected models include the Dell Inspiron 1100, 1150, 5100, 5150, and 5160. Also affected is the Latitude 100L, a near-clone of these models.

Dell acknowledged this problem and designed a new fan with a better heatsink and heatpipes to provide better cooling with less noise. Any repairs made at this point will include the redesigned parts.

On September 20, Inspiron 5150 owners in the US brought a class action against Dell. The settlement included 100% cash reimbursement for certain repairs, and an extended limited warranty to cover those types of repairs that become necessary for one year.

Following the lawsuit detailed above, in October 2006 customers who had purchased Dell Inspiron 1100, 1150, 5100, 5150, and 5160 notebooks filed a class action lawsuit against Dell, alleging misconduct in connection with the design, manufacture, warranting, advertising and selling of these computers. A similar action started in Canada.

Overheating has been reduced by using compressed air duster spray. Spraying the keyboard, the Microprocessor Thermal-Cooling Assembly located under the "I" - "backspace" keys, rear air vent/exhaust, bottom air intake, and side air vent (all located on the right side of affected systems) have been effective in reducing the running temperature from a normal operating temperature of 77-87 °C to 45-55 °C under average load.

Alternately, some users of these affected models found relief by underclocking their processors.

Motherboard 

On a number of Inspiron 5150 and Latitude 100L systems, a design flaw in the positioning of a tab on the C panel on the underside of the laptop has led to problems. Any pressure applied to the top left-hand corner of the laptop causes this tab to press against the motherboard and in particular against the "LVC14A" chip. This causes the solder between this chip and the motherboard to break. This causes sudden shut-downs of the system as a result of any movement of the laptop; in certain cases the laptop will not re-boot at all. Dell has redesigned later models of the 5150 to avoid this problem. Some models reveal cases where someone has manually snapped off the tab from the C panel by hand during the manufacturing process. Dell  covers this fault in the United States under the Lundell Settlement, although it is not known whether Dell will fix this fault free of charge outside the USA. In January 2007 a similar lawsuit started in Canada, and Dell in the Netherlands has agreed to repair Dutch computers following criticism in the consumer programme Kassa.

This has also been a problem with the Inspiron 1150, with the same chip giving problems with broken solder. Re-soldering is not recommended. Re-heating the pins can re-establish the connection and solve the power-off problem at the expense of possibly losing the use of the touch-pad mouse.

Battery recall of 2006 
Dell posted notices to many of their laptop customers on August 14, 2006, saying that the Sony batteries on the following models could combust, or even explode:

Models Affected

Users of many of these computers purchased between April 2004 and July 18, 2006 received the recommendation that they should remove the batteries and run their computers on AC power until replacements arrived.
Problematic batteries made by Sony led to recall programs at other laptop computer companies as well, including Hitachi, Toshiba, Lenovo (IBM) and Apple.

Power supply issues 
Most Dell laptop computers have a special external power supply (PSU) which cannot be replaced by a third-party universal supply. The PSU has what's called UniqueWare™ Add-Only Memory, known under type DS2501. It is a parasitic power circuit memory chip connected to the center identification pin in the plug, via a 2m long unshielded wire alongside the PSU cable. This chip produces a special signal using a 1 wire communication protocol known as "1-wire" in identifying the PSU as an original Dell PSU. This chip handles all the data needed to authenticate a charge. If a power supply not made by Dell is used, or the cable near the connector becomes damaged as is not infrequent after some use, the PSU stops charging the battery and the CPU runs slower, although the computer can be used indefinitely so long as it remains plugged in. If this problem is present at startup, the message "The AC power adapter type cannot be determined. Your system will operate slower and the battery will not charge" is displayed. This will continue until the external PSU is replaced. A few third-party suppliers make power supplies with specific provision for Dell computers at lower prices than Dell's. It is possible to work round the slowdown, but not the battery charging, by installing a CPU clock utility. On some models (the 9100 for instance), the problem can be worked around by starting the computer without a battery installed and fitting the battery after the computer has booted.

Another problem arises after much use with the motherboard power connector; flap-like metal parts which contact the outside of the plug lose their tension and fail to make contact so that power does not reach the computer. The "official" solution is to replace the connector on the motherboard, which requires partial dis-assembly of the computer and desoldering a part with several pins; many companies charge a considerable sum for the work involved. Various simple alternatives have been suggested; for example a thin "skin" of solder on the outside of the barrel of the connector on the PSU (with care not to overheat the connector's plastic parts; and this thickened connector should not be used with other, not faulty Dell laptops, as it will stretch the springs and damage or even overheat the plug and socket assembly, causing them to melt or bond permanently).

One other problem can happen with the wattage rating of the power supply. There are two Dell power supplies that were used for different Inspiron models which have the same plug assembly and voltage, a 65-watt supply model PA-6 and a 90 watt supply model PA-9. Some models (for example the Inspiron 1100) shipped with a PA-9. If a PA-6 (or equivalent aftermarket supply) is used in these models then the system might not boot at times. In such cases, it will light the battery light for a few seconds when the supply is plugged in. This can also happen if the power supply becomes marginal. Marginal supplies can show as supplying full voltage even if tested with a voltmeter while the supply is plugged into the computer and an attempt is made to turn on the computer.

These problems are discussed in detail, and solutions and workarounds suggested, in a discussion on Tom's hardware site, and on The Laptop Junction site.

Hibernation sensor problem 

A problem exists with the hibernation sensor located in some older laptops. Unlike many laptops that use a mechanical switch to detect when the lid is closed, in these systems the sensor is a magnetic reed switch that is located between the touchpad and the front edge of the laptop. There is a magnet that is located in the top lid above this switch, and when the lid is closed the magnet triggers the reed switch. If the magnet loses strength then the system will not go into suspend or hibernation if the lid is closed. The magnet strength can be checked by running a paper clip along the top edge of the screen. A worse problem happens if the reed switch fails. Sometimes the switches will fail in a closed position with the contacts sticking together. In that case the system will not switch on. There are several ways to check for this. First the laptop can be partially disassembled and the mouse assembly can be unplugged from the system board and the system switched on. If the system boots with the mouse unplugged then it is the switch. Another way to check for the problem is by running a magnet over the reed switch, there should be a faint click when the magnet triggers the switch. This does not require disassembly but the magnet must be in the correct position and be strong enough. Some people have modified the circuitry of the laptop by cutting the switch off of the assembly, with the downside being the system will no longer suspend if the lid is closed.

Vertical line LCD problem 
Some 17" Inspiron 8600, 9200, 9300, 6000, 1750, and XPS Gen 2 notebook LCDs have a vertical line manufacturing defect. Symptoms range from individual lines to entire bars of the screen with inverted colors.
Most problems showed after 2–4 years of usage.

Dell has been very reluctant to replace these panels after guarantee, although there was a direct link to the defective parts from their suppliers. Even warranty customers have had difficulty getting replacements, and replaced screens often develop the defect after a short time.

LCD Hinge Detachment problem 
In some Inspiron laptops an issue exists where a hinge holding the LCD screen may, as a result of the forces resulting from the large screen, rip its plastic standoffs holding it from the chassis. This issue seems to be prevalent on the Inspiron 15-7559 and 15-5547 models.

Dell has not been uniform in their repair of such issues with some people not being able to get repair even under warranty and others being able to get repair outside of warranty.

References 

Dell laptops
Computer-related introductions in 2000
Consumer electronics brands